The Distinguished Intelligence Cross is the highest decoration awarded by the United States Central Intelligence Agency.  It is given for "a voluntary act or acts of extraordinary heroism involving the acceptance of existing dangers with conspicuous fortitude and exemplary courage".  Only a handful of people have been awarded this medal in the history of the agency, most posthumously.  As a consequence, it is one of the rarest awards for valor in the United States.

The cross is the agency's equivalent of the military's Service Cross, i.e., Navy Cross, Army Distinguished Service Cross, Air Force Cross. The agency has two awards for valor; the other is the Intelligence Star, which is analogous to the military's Silver Star.

Known recipients 
 Leo F. Baker, posthumously for the Bay of Pigs invasion
 William F. Buckley
 John T. Downey
 Richard Fecteau
 Wade C. Gray, posthumously for the Bay of Pigs invasion
 Thomas W. "Pete" Ray, posthumously for the Bay of Pigs invasion
 Riley W. Shamburger, posthumously for the Bay of Pigs invasion
 Greg Vogle, paramilitary officer and CIA trailblazer
 Molly Huckaby Hardy, posthumously for the 1998 United States embassy bombings in Nairobi
 David N. Tyson, for actions during the Battle of Qala-i-Jangi

See also 
 Awards and decorations of the United States government

References

Awards and decorations of the Central Intelligence Agency